Jack Duggan may refer to:

 Jack Duggan (ice hockey), Canadian ice hockey player
 Jack Duggan (politician), member of the Queensland Legislative Assembly
 Jack Duggan (hurler), Irish hurler

See also
 John Duggan (disambiguation)